Michael Lorenz was the dean of the Center for Veterinary Health Sciences, Oklahoma State University–Stillwater, Oklahoma, from 2001-2011.

He obtained his Bachelor of Science, Animal Sciences, Oklahoma State University; D.V.M., Oklahoma State University; internship, Cornell University.

Lorenz became Associate Dean for Academic Affairs in August 1997, Interim Dean in July 2001 and was appointed Dean in April 2004.

References

Oklahoma State University alumni
Oklahoma State University faculty
Veterinary scientists
American veterinarians
Male veterinarians
Year of birth missing (living people)
Living people